Vernon Arthur Thies (April 1, 1926 – February 10, 2013) was an American Major League Baseball pitcher.

Born in St. Louis, Missouri, Thies served in the 117th Infantry Division during World War II. After discharge, he attended the University of Illinois at Urbana–Champaign for one year.

After playing for several minor league teams, Thies joined the Pittsburgh Pirates in 1954, pitching in 34 games (33 starts) while collecting a 3–9 record and a 3.87 earned run average in 130 innings. In addition, he hurled three complete games, including a three-hit shutout on August 13 against the Philadelphia Phillies at Connie Mack Stadium. His ERA was the second-best for the last-place Pirates, being surpassed only by Dick Littlefield (3.60).

In 1955, Thies made one start for the Pirates at Forbes Field while facing the Brooklyn Dodgers. He allowed five runs (two earned) on five hits and three walks, while striking out one batter in 3 innings of work. He was credited with the loss and never appeared in a major league game again.

In a two-season career, Thies posted a 3–10 record with a 3.90 and 57 strikeouts in 134 innings. He later pitched for Triple A Columbus Jets in 1956. It was his last season in organized baseball.

After baseball, Thies worked in sales for more than 40 years.

Thies died in 2013 in Florissant, Missouri, at the age of 86.

References

External links

1926 births
2013 deaths
Baseball players from St. Louis
Cairo Egyptians players
Chanute (minor league baseball) players
Charleston Rebels players
Columbus Jets players
Denver Bears players
Hollywood Stars players
Major League Baseball pitchers
New Orleans Pelicans (baseball) players
Pittsburgh Pirates players
United States Army personnel of World War II
York White Roses players